Ecology Letters is a monthly peer-reviewed scientific journal published by Wiley and the French National Centre for Scientific Research. Peter H. Thrall is the current editor-in-chief, taking over from Tim Coulson (University of Oxford). The journal covers research on all aspects of ecology.

Abstracting and indexing 
Ecology Letters is abstracted and indexed in Academic Search/Academic Search Premier, AGRICOLA, Aquatic Sciences and Fisheries Abstracts, Biological Abstracts, BIOSIS and BIOSIS Previews, CAB Abstracts, CAB Health/CABDirect, Cambridge Scientific Abstracts databases, Current Contents/Agriculture, Biology & Environmental Sciences, GEOBASE, GeoRef, Index Medicus/MEDLINE, InfoTrac, PubMed, Science Citation Index, Scopus, and The Zoological Record.

According to the 2021 Journal Citation Reports, Ecology Letters is ranked sixth out of one hundred and seventy-three (6/173) journals in the category "Ecology," with a 2021 impact factor of 11.274.

References

External links 
 

Wiley-Blackwell academic journals
Ecology journals
Publications established in 1998
English-language journals
Monthly journals